Alexander Fisher Cameron (October 13, 1860 – November 24, 1943) was a merchant, lumberman and political figure in Nova Scotia. He represented Guysborough County in the Nova Scotia House of Assembly from 1890 to 1894 as a Liberal-Conservative member.

He was educated at the Commercial College in Halifax. In 1882, he married Edith J. Fraser. He served on the municipal council and was warden for Saint Mary's, Guysborough County. He died due to heart disease in 1943.

References 

The Canadian parliamentary companion, 1891 JA Gemmill

1860 births
1943 deaths
Nova Scotia municipal councillors
People from Guysborough County, Nova Scotia
Progressive Conservative Association of Nova Scotia MLAs